Anolis ferreus, the Morne Constant anole, also known as the Marie-Gallant anole, is a species of anole lizard that is endemic to the island of Marie-Galante, which is part of Guadeloupe in the Caribbean Lesser Antilles. It has been recorded as an escapee in Fort Myers, Florida, but does not appear to have become established.

It has a yellow-green dorsal surface, and a blue-gray head with yellow around the eye. Males have prominent tail crests.

It is primarily active during the middle part of the day, retreating to high perches in the late afternoon.

It was formerly considered a subspecies of A. marmoratus.

See also
List of Anolis lizards

References

External links
Anolis ferreus at the Encyclopedia of Life
Anolis ferreus at the Reptile Database

Anoles
Endemic fauna of Guadeloupe
Reptiles of Guadeloupe
Lizards of the Caribbean
Reptiles described in 1864
Taxa named by Edward Drinker Cope